The 2014 Oral-B USA 500 was a NASCAR Sprint Cup Series stock car race that was held on August 31, 2014, at Atlanta Motor Speedway in Hampton, Georgia. Contested over 335 laps on the  quad-oval, it was the 25th race of the 2014 NASCAR Sprint Cup Series. Kasey Kahne of Hendrick Motorsports won the race, his first win of the season. Matt Kenseth finished second, while Denny Hamlin, Jimmie Johnson and Carl Edwards rounded out the top five. The top rookies of the race were Kyle Larson (8th), Michael Annett (21st), and Austin Dillon (24th).

Previous week's race
Joey Logano took the lead with 45 laps to go and had to hold off a late race charge by Team Penske teammate Brad Keselowski to score his third win of the 2014 season, at the Irwin Tools Night Race. Logano described the result as "awesome", and also reflected on his personal best 2014 campaign. Keselowski praised Logano's performance, stating that "he ran a great race" while his car "was just about equal to Joey's but he just had better track position than on us".

Report

Background

The track's turns are banked at twenty-four degrees, while the  front stretch, the location of the finish line, and the  back stretch are banked at five. The track's racing surface width varies from 55 feet to 60 feet. The defending race winner from 2013 was Kyle Busch.

Tony Stewart's status had been undecided going into the race. "It's just an emotional roller coaster all week, you know what I mean?" Greg Zipadelli, vice president of competition at Stewart-Haas Racing, stated after the previous weekend's race at Bristol Motor Speedway. "It is what it is. We do the best we can with what we've got right now. We'll keep praying, keep our fingers crossed that we get the boss back sooner rather than later." On Thursday, it was announced by NASCAR executive vice president and chief racing development officer Steve O'Donnell, that Stewart would return to racing at Atlanta.  O'Donnell added that NASCAR had "remained in constant contact with his race team and we will stay very close to this situation as Stewart returns to competition".

On Friday, Stewart spoke publicly for the first time since the events of August 9 at Canandaigua Motorsports Park in upstate New York. Stewart described the situation as "one of the toughest tragedies I've ever had to deal with, both professionally and personally. It will affect my life forever". He said he reached out to the Ward family and said "I want them to know I'm thinking about them and praying for them." Stewart-Haas Racing executive vice president Brett Frood said "for Tony, it's all about the healing process. That's why he's in the car," when asked why Stewart decided to return while the investigation into Ward's death remained open. "I am not going to comment on the incident itself. It was a tragic accident." Stewart declined to answer any questions about the incident due to the ongoing investigation.

Later, NASCAR President Mike Helton spoke about Stewart and a waiver that he would receive, if he won at Atlanta or the following weekend at Richmond. With the waiver, Stewart would be eligible to make the Chase for the Sprint Cup. While Stewart had not attempted to qualify the last two races and, therefore, would have been ineligible, NASCAR had the ability to grant an exemption to a driver for "unique circumstances". "We made our decisions based on the circumstances we've got currently," Helton said. "And I think most everyone in this room understands at NASCAR, our effort, our scope of responsibility and authority is limited to the NASCAR community. We take the current circumstances that we are dealt with and make what we hope to be the best absolute conclusion. That's what we're talking about today, is the current set of circumstances and our reaction to them."

Reaction to the waiver was mostly positive from fellow drivers. "I'm happy to know if I was out of the car for some reason that I'd get a chance to get back in the Chase," Brian Vickers said. "There's a lot of circumstances that I don't know exactly how they'd handle them. Obviously they've set a precedent here with Tony. One day I'd like to have kids. Does that mean I get to be at the hospital with my wife if she's having our first child even if it means missing a race but I can still make the Chase?" "I think the whole intent of eligibility for the Chase is so that somebody doesn't go take a vacation after winning a few races," Jeff Gordon said. "(NASCAR) wants the teams and the drivers that have earned their way in it. I believe if they win a race they should be in it."

Entry list
The entry list for the Oral-B USA 500 was released on Monday, August 25, 2014 at 2:08 p.m. Eastern time. Forty-four drivers were entered for the race.

Practice

First practice

Qualifying

Harvick felt that his car did not change much during qualifying, but felt that he "messed the first round up really bad trying to do something that I wasn't doing in practice". Brad Keselowski joined Harvick on the front row, stating that his qualifying run – 0.052 seconds off Harvick's pole time – was his best since he started competing at Atlanta, praising his team's work in the process. In his first Sprint Cup qualifying session, Nationwide Series regular Ty Dillon qualified in 29th position. Dillon described the situation as "touch to come in...and expect a great qualifying effort", before stating that "it was a lot of fun going out there and qualifying with the big guys". 44 drivers contested qualifying, with Michael McDowell failing to qualify.

Qualifying results

Practice (post-qualifying)

Second practice

Final practice

Race

First half

Start

The race was scheduled to begin at 7:46 PM Eastern time but started around five minutes later when Kevin Harvick led the field to the green flag. Brad Keselowski, who started second, spun the tires on the initial start and fell back to fifth. Harvick reported seeing a cat run across the race track in turn 3 on lap 14; it turned out to actually be a squirrel, while Jimmie Johnson had black strip-like objects stuck to the hood pins of his grill. The caution flew for the first time on lap 38 for debris; NASCAR called Carl Edwards down to pit road to replace a faulty transponder, but he was allowed to retake his spot in 5th place. The race restarted on lap 45, and ran under green flag conditions until the caution flew for the second time on lap 78, after Jeff Gordon's car blew a tire and forced him into the wall in turn 3. Denny Hamlin took the lead from Harvick during the pit stops.

The race restarted on lap 85, with Harvick and Hamlin dueling for the lead, before Hamlin was able to take it eventually on lap 86, holding Harvick all the way until lap 108. The caution flew for the third time on lap 117 after Ryan Truex spun through the grass on the front stretch. Hamlin retook the lead during the pit stop cycle, and led the field to the restart on lap 122. Tony Stewart made contact with the wall exiting turn 2 on the restart, while at the front, Matt Kenseth took the lead on lap 123. This pass for the lead occurred just before the caution flag flew again after Marcos Ambrose blew an engine. The race restarted on lap 135, and Kurt Busch took the lead from Kenseth on lap 136. Kenseth retook the lead on lap 158, before Harvick made his way back to the front, on lap 165.

Second half
Brad Keselowski took the lead as Harvick made his stop. Tony Stewart brought out the fifth caution on lap 172 after he hit the wall in turn 2. Stewart's crew chief Chad Johnston stated that Stewart "got off to a good start", but also stated that it was good to have his driver back in the car. Matt Kenseth made his stop before the caution and reassumed the lead for the restart on lap 180. Harvick retook the lead on lap 183, and held the lead for the remainder of the stint, before the race's sixth caution on lap 209, due to some debris falling off the car of Kasey Kahne. Kenseth retook the lead during the pit stops, and held the lead at the restart on lap 215. Harvick retook the lead with 98 laps to go, before giving up the lead to pit with 67 laps to go.

Calamity
Debris on the backstretch helped Harvick's cause however; it brought out the seventh caution of the race. Hamlin assumed the lead under caution, before Harvick cycled back through to the lead once Hamlin had made his next pit stop of the race. The race restarted with 62 laps to go. Keselowski brought out the eighth caution with 28 laps to go after rear-ending Josh Wise. Hamlin won the race off pit road and assumed the lead for the restart, with 23 laps to go. Kahne took the lead almost immediately, and managed to fend off his rivals until the final two laps, when the caution flags flew for the ninth time, after Kyle Busch sent Martin Truex Jr. into the wall. Kenseth won the race off pit road. On the first green-white-checker attempt, the field were unable to make it through turn one before cars started crashing.

Finish
Kahne took the lead on the second green-white-checker attempt and held off Kenseth to score his first win of the season. Kahne felt that his car was "all over the place during the race but the guys stayed with me and worked hard", but felt proud that they had sealed his place in the Chase for the Sprint Cup. Kenseth described the last two laps as "really intense", but also felt that "things are looking up" for the Joe Gibbs Racing driver.

Race results

Race statistics
 21 lead changes among different drivers
 10 cautions for 56 laps
 Time of race: 3:55:24
 Kasey Kahne won his first race in 2014

Media

Television

Radio

Standings after the race

Drivers' Championship standings

Manufacturers' Championship standings

Note: Only the first sixteen positions are included for the driver standings.

References

Oral-B USA 500
Oral-B USA 500
NASCAR races at Atlanta Motor Speedway
Oral B USA 500